Ouanary is a commune of French Guiana, an overseas region and department of France located in South America. Ouanary lies at the mouth of the river Oiapoque. Ouanary is the least populated commune of French Guiana. The settlement of Ouanary is accessible only by boat, helicopter, or light aircraft at Ouanary Airport, a  dirt runway.

History
In 1665, the area was claimed for France by Antoine de Noël de la Trompe d'Or. In the 18th century, the Jesuits used the Palikur Amerindians for labor. Later they were replaced by slaves from Africa. In 1852, a penal colony was established on a former coffee plantation, and was the first agricultural penal colony. The colony was finally closed in 1910, and was an economic failure with many prisoners dying or becoming ill. Between 1853 and 1864, 749 prisoners died. In 1950, Ouanary became a commune.

Nature
Montagne d'Argent is located in the commune. In 1998, the mountain came under the protection of Conservatoire du littoral, because 22 petroglyphs had been discovered on the mountain.

Economy
The economy is based on fishing and agriculture with the main crops being roucou, indigo, and sugar cane.

See also
Communes of French Guiana

References

External links
Official website (in French)

Communes of French Guiana